There are several religious or popular celebrations (the Festa), pilgrimages (romarias) and processions (procissão) in Póvoa de Varzim, Portugal. Most of these festivals occur around the Holy Week or during the summer.

Festival of Saint Peter

The city's municipal holiday is June 29, Saint Peter's day (Dia de São Pedro), the fisherman saint and the popular patron saint of the city. The Saint Peter festivities stopped in 1892, due to the fishing tragedy that year, but in 1962, the City Hall tried to revive the tradition, and the festival recovered with great success and became the main celebration of the city. In 1974, when the government authorized local holidays, the city hall declared it the municipal holiday.

Around this date, the neighbourhood windows are decorated; and, on the night of 28th to 29th the population gets together in celebration, dancing and eating by the light of fires (fogueiras). The traditional neighbourhoods compete in the "rusgas" (a sort of carnival) and the creation of thrones to Saint Peter. This festival is very important and rivals Christmas and Easter as the event of the year.

The neighbourhoods competing in the rusgas are Bairro Norte, Bairro Sul, Bairro de Belém, Bairro da Mariadeira, Bairro da Matriz, and Bairro Regufe. The most popular are Norte, Sul and Matriz; but the greatest competition is between Norte (north) and Sul (south). The supporters live not only in the geographical area of the neighbourhood but stretch throughout the city and bordering areas. These days, the population behaves  very much like football supporters, and occasionally there are some disturbances when fans defend their preferred neighbourhood; but the competition is usually very healthy. Families, having previously emigrated to the United States and beyond, have been known to come back to Povoa, time and again, simply to relish the spectacular feelings of excitement and community present at this festival.

Carnival
Carnival is a traditional festival in Póvoa de Varzim with the old Carnival Balls, masked people gathering in Rua da Junqueira until the late 1970s which led to the 1980s expensive carnival parades in the waterfront. The remains of such organized events are now celebrated spontaneously by the common people who gather for a parade in Avenida dos Banhos. Despite not having any sort of advertising or media coverage, Póvoa's "Spontaneous Carnival" (Carnaval dos espontâneos) started to attract thousands of people.

Easter and Anjo
Easter Monday or Anjo Festival is considered to be the second "municipal holiday". The populace works on Good Friday (national holiday) to have Monday free to picnic, a remnant of a pagan festival, formerly called "Festa da Hera" (The Ivy Festival). The local companies follow this tradition and are open on Friday and closed on Monday.

The tradition has quickly transferred to neighbouring cities. Easter Sunday is the day of blessing of the homes by the compasso, a group of church members that take the cross of Christ to every home with an open door. On this day, godchildren visit their godparents and different families compete in the Péla, a traditional local game that is played while the population awaits the visit of the compasso.

Fishing festivals
On August 15 there is the Feast of the Assumption, devotion of Póvoa's fishermen, this is one of the largest festivals of this kind in Portugal, the procession is headed by the Archbishop of Braga and the pinnacle of the procession occurs in front of the seaport, where fireworks are launched from carefully arranged boats.

Two fishing pilgrimages (romarias) are peculiar, as these are associated with the landscape: the Nossa Senhora da Saúde Pilgrimage from the First Church (Igreja Matriz) to Nossa Senhora da Saúde Chapel in the base of São Félix hill, and Santo André Pilgrimage, that goes along the beach to Santo André Chapel.

São Félix is a reference point for fishermen at sea and of historical importance. On the last Sunday of May, the Pilgrimage of Nossa Senhora da Saúde (Our Lady of Health) covers a distance of 7 kilometres (4.25 mi) between the Igreja Matriz of Póvoa de Varzim and the Nossa Senhora da Saúde Chapel, at the foot of São Félix. Mostly, the worshippers of this saint make promises, notably fishermen of the municipalities of Póvoa de Varzim and Vila do Conde.

Near Cape Santo André, there is a rocky formation known as Penedo do Santo (Saint's Rock), which has a mark that the Poveiro fishermen believe to be a footprint of Saint Andrew (Santo André). They still believe that this saint is the Boatman of Souls and that he frees the souls of those whom drown in the sea, fishing them from the depths of the ocean after a shipwreck. The celebration of Saint Andrew occurs on the dawn of the last day of November, when groups of men and women, wearing black hoods and holding lamps, go to the chapel via the beach, singing and in the end surround the chapel, forming the Ponto das Almas (Souls' Point).

Fairs
In the last fortnight of September, during the Senhora das Dores festival there is the typical Senhora das Dores Pottery Fair, with many different tents, installed in the plaza near the Senhora das Dores Church, which sell diverse wares of special traditional Portuguese pottery. These feasts have roots in 1768, year when an icon of Mary was placed in the old Chapel of Senhor do Monte. The followers of the sect originated the annual party, procession and fair.

The HortiPóvoa - the horticultural Fair of Póvoa de Varzim takes place during the summer in Aguçadoura. Every week, on Sundays, there is the Estela Fair, which is a market dedicated to trade of vegetables. Recently, other annual fairs had been established: the Milk Agricultural Fair in São Pedro de Rates, with regional products, such as dairy products, sweets, honey, cured meats, wines and olive oil; the Horse Fair in Terroso where, besides trading, it is possible to attend horse shows.

Still, there are other weekly fairs: the Moninhas fair (Monday) and Aver-o-Mar fair (Sunday morning), and also the Antiques Fair, in Praça do Almada, that occurs every second Sunday of the month.

Festivals calendar

* date varies.

References

Carnivals in Portugal
Culture in Póvoa de Varzim
Cultural festivals in Portugal
Parades in Portugal
Tourist attractions in Póvoa de Varzim
Summer events in Portugal